Iñigo Dominic Lazaro Pascual (born September 14, 1997) is a Filipino actor, singer and songwriter. He is popularly known for his 2016 hit single, "Dahil Sa'yo", the first number one song on Billboard Philippines then-new Philippine Top 20 chart which also won "Song of the Year" at the 30th Awit Awards, the Philippine version of the Grammys. He is the son of actor Piolo Pascual.

Early life 
Iñigo Dominic Lazaro Pascual was born on September 14, 1997, in the Philippines. Pascual moved to the United States when he was 8 years old. At the age of 17, he moved back to the Philippines to pursue his career in entertainment.

Career

2014–2015: Career beginnings 
Pascual's first lead role in film came in 2014 when he starred in the teen romance film Relaks, It's Just Pag-ibig, which was directed by Antoinette Jadaone and Irene Villamor. He played the role of Josh Brillantes, a teenage boy who joined in the journey of a girl who wanted to meet a pair of lovers during a blue moon after she picked up a love letter written by a man named Elias. Piolo Pacual, Inigo's father, has a special participation in the film as the mysterious letter writer, Elias. The film was produced by Spring Films and distributed by Star Cinema.

In 2015, Pascual starred in another teen romance film, Para sa Hopeless Romantic alongside James Reid, Nadine Lustre, and Julia Barretto. The film was directed by Andoy Ranay and was based on the Marcelo Santos III's bestselling novel of the same name. Pascual played the role of Ryan Sebastian, a fictional character from a story written by Becca, Lustre's character. Pascual then starred in Mae Cruz-Alviar's Crazy Beautiful You with another pair of popular loveteam, Kathryn Bernardo and Daniel Padilla. He played the role of Marcus Alcantara, the stepbrother of Padilla's character who had feelings for Bernardo's character.

After appearing in several episodes of anthology shows such as Maalaala Mo Kaya and Wansapanataym, Pascual landed a role in the afternoon drama series, And I Love You So. He starred in the series alongside Miles Ocampo, Julia Barretto, Dimples Romana, and Angel Aquino. He played the role of Justin Santiago, who was a love interest for both Ocampo's and Barretto's characters.

2016–2018 : Breakthrough in music 
In 2016, Pascual released his self-titled debut album under Star Music, which included the hit single Dahil Sa'Yo. The song became the first number 1 track of the short-lived Billboard Philippines Top 20 chart. In 2017, Pascual was tapped by Disney Philippines to record the Philippine version of "Remember Me," the theme song from Disney-Pixar's animated movie, Coco. In 2019, Pascual released his first international solo single, Options. The track was produced by LA-based instrumentalist Bernard "HARV" Harvey. On May 6, 2020, amidst the COVID-19 pandemic, Pascual was featured in 88rising's online music festival called Asia Rising Forever. During the livestream event, Pascual performed a cover of Post Malone's Better Now.  In June 2020, Pascual appeared as a musical act in Filipino-American stand-up comedian Jo Koy's Netflix special entitled Jo Koy: In HIs Elements.

American television debut
On September 15, 2021, Deadline Hollywood announced that Pascual had joined the cast of Fox drama series Monarch in his American television debut.

Filmography

Film

Television

Discography

Chart performance

Songs performed on Monarch
"Family Tradition" (with Joshua Sasse, Anna Friel and Beth Ditto)
"Photograph" (with Trace Adkins)
"Watermelon Sugar" (with Emma Milani)

Awards and nominations

References

External links

1997 births
Actors from Manila
Star Magic
VJs (media personalities)
ABS-CBN personalities
Living people
Filipino male film actors
Filipino male dancers
21st-century Filipino male singers
Filipino people of German descent
Star Music artists
Filipino male television actors